Marcel Žigante (1929 – 8 March 2015) was a Yugoslav and later Croatian professional football manager and former player.

Playing career
Born in Rijeka, Kingdom of Yugoslavia, present day Croatia, Žigante's football career began in a small club called Šparta Zagreb in 1943. After the end of World War II, he started playing for Dinamo Zagreb in 1945. He did not stay there for long though. First, Žigante went to Čapljina and then, in 1949, he joined Sarajevo. He played there until 1955, during which time he collected 96 league appearances. Žigante then played with Radnički Beograd as they reached 3rd place in the 1955–56 Yugoslav First League season.

His next club was Sarajevo's fierce city rival Željezničar. He played in 41 league games and scored 11 goals for the club during his three-year tenure. Žigante decided to end his playing career in 1960 after leaving Željezničar. He is remembered as one of the best right wingers during the 1940s and 1950s in Yugoslavia.

Managerial career
Although he was a geography teacher as well, Žigante stayed in football as a manager. He was first manager of Famos Hrasnica (1962–1964) during which time they got promoted to the Yugoslav Second League. After that, he was the manager of Rudar Kakanj (1964–1965) and Leotar (1965–1966). In 1966, Žigante returned to Željezničar where he was one of the creators of a great generation of players that won the Yugoslav First League in 1972 alongside Milan Ribar. He worked as the manager of Željezničar in the 1966–67 and 1967–68 seasons.

In 1968, he became the new manager of Bor (1968–1972), which he promoted to the Yugoslav First League in 1972. Žigante then managed Rijeka (1972–1973) and Čelik Zenica (1974–1975), with whom he won the UEFA Intertoto Cup in 1975.

Death
Žigante died on Sunday, 8 March 2015, in his hometown of Rijeka, Croatia.

Honours

Manager
Bor 
Yugoslav Second League: 1971–72 (East)

Čelik Zenica 
UEFA Intertoto Cup: 1975 (Joint Winner)

References

External links
 
Marcel Žigante at nogomet.lzmk.hr

1929 births
2015 deaths
Footballers from Rijeka
Association football wingers
Yugoslav footballers
GNK Dinamo Zagreb players
HNK Čapljina players
FK Sarajevo players
FK Radnički Beograd players
FK Željezničar Sarajevo players
Yugoslav First League players
Yugoslav Second League players
Yugoslav football managers
FK Famos Hrasnica managers
FK Rudar Kakanj managers
FK Leotar managers
FK Željezničar Sarajevo managers
FK Bor managers
HNK Rijeka managers
HNK Orijent managers
NK Čelik Zenica managers
Yugoslav First League managers